Kresge Building may refer to:

Kresge Building (Augusta, Maine), listed on the National Register of Historic Places in Kennebec County, Maine
Kresge Building (Boston, Massachusetts)
Kresge Auditorium, on the campus of MIT in Cambridge, Massachusetts
Kresge Building (Detroit, Michigan)
Kresge Building (Wilmington, Delaware), listed on the National Register of Historic Places in Sussex County, Delaware